The Rochester Bugs were a minor league baseball team based in Rochester, Minnesota. The team, managed by Art Lizzette, played in the Minnesota–Wisconsin League in 1912. It was the last professional team to come from the city until the 1958 Rochester A's.

References

Rochester, Minnesota
Baseball teams established in 1912
Defunct minor league baseball teams
Professional baseball teams in Minnesota
1912 establishments in Minnesota
Defunct baseball teams in Minnesota
Baseball teams disestablished in 1912
1912 disestablishments in Minnesota
Minnesota-Wisconsin League teams